Kifuta Kiala Makangu (born 8 January 1988) is a Congolese professional footballer who plays as a forward for SSV Jeddeloh of the Regionalliga Nord.

Career 
In summer 2020, Kiala signed for SSV Jeddeloh.

References

External links
 

1988 births
Living people
Footballers from Kinshasa
Democratic Republic of the Congo footballers
Association football forwards
Segunda Divisão players
C.D. Olivais e Moscavide players
C.D. Mafra players
Clube Oriental de Lisboa players
BSV Schwarz-Weiß Rehden players
VfB Oldenburg players
SSV Jeddeloh players
Expatriate footballers in Portugal
Expatriate footballers in Germany
21st-century Democratic Republic of the Congo people